SMJR may refer to:
 Stratford-upon-Avon and Midland Junction Railway
 Scottish Midland Junction Railway